Erskine Park is a suburb of Sydney in the state of New South Wales, Australia. Erskine Park is located 42 kilometres west of the Sydney central business district, in the local government area of the City of Penrith and is part of the Greater Western Sydney region.

Erskine Park, along with Colyton, are the easternmost suburbs in the City of Penrith. Erskine Park is a growing, predominantly residential suburb with some industrial developments. The suburb has a high school, primary school and some local shops. It has two schools, Erskine Park High School and James Erskine Public School.

History
Erskine Park is named after James Erskine, Lieutenant Governor to Lachlan Macquarie, who was granted land in this area in the early days of the colony.  The local school, James Erskine Public School, is named in his honor.

Population
At the 2016 census, there were 6,436 residents in Erskine Park.
 Aboriginal and Torres Strait Islander people made up 2.2% of the population. 
 This suburb has a younger population than average, with a median age of 34 and 19.3% of people aged 14 years or under. 
 The most common ancestries in Erskine Park were Australian 25.0%, English 21.9%, Irish 5.9%, Scottish 4.7% and Filipino 4.3%.
 72.5% of people were born in Australia. The next most common countries of birth were Philippines 4.2%, England 2.3% and New Zealand 1.7%.
 75.2% of people only spoke English at home. Other languages spoken at home included Arabic 2.6% and Tagalog 2.4%,
 The top responses for religious affiliation were Catholic 39.0%, No Religion 19.0% and Anglican 16.3%. 
 Top industries of employment included Road Freight Transport 3.5%, Hospitals (except Psychiatric Hospitals) 3.2%, Takeaway Food Services 3.1% and Supermarket and Grocery Stores 3.0%.	. 
 The median weekly household income was $2,104 and this was higher than the national median of $1,438.

Commercial area
The local shopping centre features a supermarket, hairdressers, butcher, bakery, pharmacy and an Aldi.
There was a newsagent in the main shopping centre until late 2017

An industrial area on the southern outskirts is known as the Erskine Business Park. It contains warehouses for DHL Supply Chain, Sony DADC, BlueScope Steel, Koorong Bookstore, Hasbro, Ceva and a Woolworths Liquor distribution centre. There is a large park located near the industrial area along the main road. There is a footpath that accommodates pedestrians and bike riders and there is a basketball/netball court.

Transport
Erskine Park is located near the junction of the M4 Western Motorway and Westlink M7 Motorway. There is a link road proposed from the Business Park to the Westlink M7.

Schools and churches
 James Erskine Public School has over 500 students.
 Erskine Park High School has over 1000 students, with a special needs support unit.
 Cornerstone Baptist Church is a small church affiliated with the Australian Fellowship of Bible-Believing Churches.

Recreation
A bike track runs from Erskine Park Road to Bennett Road in St Clair.  A natural bush area in Erskine Park is used for both biking and camping.

Notable residents
 Usman Khawaja, Australian cricketer
 Steve Turner, Former NRL player
 Paige Hadley, Australian netballer

References

External links 
 Penrith Local Suburb Profiles
 Erskine Park and St Clair Community Website

Suburbs of Sydney
City of Penrith